In mathematics,  dianalytic manifolds are possibly non-orientable generalizations of complex analytic manifolds. A dianalytic structure on a manifold is given by an atlas of 
charts such that the transition maps are either complex analytic maps or complex conjugates of complex analytic maps. Every dianalytic manifold is given by the quotient of an analytic manifold (possibly non-connected) by a fixed-point-free involution changing the complex structure to its complex conjugate structure.

References

Riemann surfaces